Hassan Mila Sesay (born October 22, 1987 in Freetown) is a Sierra Leonean international footballer, playing as a left back.

International
He played also for the Sierra Leone national football team. Sesay was a member of Sierra Leone U-17 team at the 2003 FIFA U-17 World Championship in Finland.

Clubs
2003–06 Ports Authority F.C. (Sierra Leone)
2006 Klubi-04 (Finland)
2007 Atlantis FC (Finland)
2008 Kuopion Palloseura (Finland)
2009 Örebro SK (Sweden)
2010–11 FC Viikingit (Finland)
2011–2013 MYPA (Finland)
2014– FC Lahti (Finland)

References

1987 births
Living people
Sierra Leonean footballers
Sierra Leonean expatriate footballers
Sportspeople from Freetown
Association football midfielders
Sierra Leone international footballers
Veikkausliiga players
Ykkönen players
Ports Authority F.C. players
Klubi 04 players
Atlantis FC players
Örebro SK players
Myllykosken Pallo −47 players
FC Lahti players
HIFK Fotboll players
IF Gnistan players
Sierra Leonean expatriate sportspeople in Sweden
Sierra Leonean expatriate sportspeople in Finland
Expatriate footballers in Finland
Expatriate footballers in Sweden